The Lahore women's cricket team is the women's representative cricket team for Lahore. They competed in the National Women's Cricket Championship between 2004–05 and 2017, winning the tournament twice.

History
Lahore joined the National Women's Cricket Championship for its inaugural season in 2004–05, and competed in it in every subsequent season until it ended in 2017. The side reached the final of the competition in its inaugural season, but lost to Karachi. The following season, however, they won the competition for the first time, beating Karachi in the final by 40 runs. They then went on to those three finals in the next four seasons, twice to Karachi and once to Zarai Taraqiati Bank Limited.

Lahore won the National Women's Cricket Championship for the second time in 2014, beating Karachi by 18 runs, helped by 84* from captain Bismah Maroof. In the final season of the competition, 2017, Lahore finished as runners-up in the Super League section of the tournament.

Players

Notable players
Players who played for Lahore and played internationally are listed below, in order of first international appearance (given in brackets):

 Sharmeen Khan (1997)
 Nazia Sadiq (1997)
 Maryam Butt (2003)
 Sabahat Rasheed (2005)
 Sana Javed (2005)
 Tasqeen Qadeer (2005)
 Shumaila Mushtaq (2005)
 Bismah Maroof (2006)
 Marina Iqbal (2009)
 Sidra Ameen (2011)
 Elizebath Khan (2012)
 Iram Javed (2013)
 Anam Amin (2014)
 Sidra Nawaz (2014)
 Aliya Riaz (2014)
 Fareeha Mehmood (2018)
 Kaynat Hafeez (2019)
 Tuba Hassan (2022)
 Sadaf Shamas (2022)

Seasons

National Women's Cricket Championship

Honours
 National Women's Cricket Championship:
 Winners (2): 2005–06 & 2014

See also
 Lahore cricket teams

References

Women's cricket teams in Pakistan
Cricket in Lahore